Josephine Lara Cotto (born 15 January 2000) is a Puerto Rican footballer who plays as a midfielder for the Puerto Rico women's national team.

Early life and college

Cotto attended Menlo-Atherton High School with whom she won the Central Coast Section Division I championship in 2016. She scored the winning goal in the final match. 

In the 2017 Northern California State Cup Finals, Cotto tore her anterior crucial ligament for the first time. Two games into her freshman year at University of Pennsylvania, she tore her ACL for the second time during a team practice which sidelined her for over a year.

International career

In the fall of 2015, Cotto represented both the Puerto Rico U-17 team and Puerto Rico U-20 team in their respective Caribbean Zone qualifiers for the 2016 CONCACAF Women's U-17 Championship and 2015 CONCACAF Women's U-20 Championship.

In June 2021, Cotto made her senior debut for the Puerto Rican women's national football team in a 5–1 friendly loss to Uruguay. On 21 October 2021, Cotto scored her first goal for Puerto Rico, opening the scoring in a 6–1 friendly victory over Guyana.

References

2000 births
Living people
Women's association football midfielders
American women's soccer players
Puerto Rican women's footballers
Puerto Rico women's international footballers
Soccer players from California
People from Menlo Park, California
People from San Mateo County, California
Penn Quakers women's soccer players